Tanzania competed at the 1968 Summer Olympics in Mexico City, Mexico. Previously, the nation had competed as Tanganyika.

Athletics

Men
Track and road events

Boxing

Men

References
Official Olympic Reports

Nations at the 1968 Summer Olympics
1968
Oly